Greatest Hits is a greatest hits album by American hip hop group N.W.A, released on July 2, 1996 via Priority Records. Composed of nineteen tracks, the compilation contains several poplular singles and songs from the group's 1988 debut album Straight Outta Compton, 1990 extended play 100 Miles and Runnin' and their second and final studio album 1991 Niggaz4Life. It includes "Gangsta Gangsta", "Fuck tha Police", previously unavailable remix of "Straight Outta Compton", "Alwayz into Somethin'", remixed "Express Yourself", and "100 Miles and Runnin'", as well as inserts from live concerts. Production was handled by Dr. Dre and DJ Yella with Eazy-E serving as executive producer.

The album made it to number 48 on the Billboard 200 and number 20 on the Top R&B/Hip-Hop Albums in the United States. It also peaked at number 43 in New Zealand and number 56 on the UK Albums Chart. It was certified gold by the Recording Industry Association of America on February 14, 2002.

In 2003, Priority Records re-released the album with two bonus tracks — "Chin Check", which was recorded for Next Friday (Original Motion Picture Soundtrack) with one-time member Snoop Dogg, and "Hello", which was recorded for Ice Cube's sixth solo studio album War & Peace Vol. 2 (The Peace Disc) — performed by the reunited N.W.A.

After the success of F. Gary Gray's 2015 film Straight Outta Compton, the album came back to music charts, re-entering UK Albums Chart at No. 49, and reaching No. 9 in Australia.

Track listing 

 Sample credits

 Track 2 contains a sample from "Funky Worm" written by Leroy Bonner, Marshall Jones, Ralph Middlebrooks, Walter Morrison, Andrew Noland and Greg Webster as recorded by Ohio Players
 Track 11 contains a sample from "The Message (Inspiration)" written by Randy Muller as recorded by Brass Construction
 Track 14 contains a sample of "That Girl's a Slut" written by Joseph Williams as recorded by Just-Ice
 Track 16 contains a sample from "Express Yourself" written by Charles Wright as recorded by Charles Wright & the Watts 103rd Street Rhythm Band
 Track 17 contains a sample from "Nowhere to Run" written by Holland–Dozier–Holland as recorded by Martha and the Vandellas and a sample from "Hang Up Your Hang-Ups" written by Herbert Hancock, Paul Jackson and Melvin Ragin as recorded by Herbie Hancock
 Track 19 contains a sample from "I Just Want to Celebrate" written by Dino Fekaris and Nick Zesses as recorded by Rare Earth

Charts

Weekly charts

Year-end charts

Certifications

References

External links

N.W.A albums
1996 greatest hits albums
Albums produced by Dr. Dre
Albums produced by DJ Yella
Gangsta rap compilation albums
Priority Records compilation albums
Ruthless Records compilation albums